Auguste-Maurice Barrès (19 August 1862 – 4 December 1923) was a French novelist, journalist and politician. Spending some time in Italy, he became a figure in French literature with the release of his work The Cult of the Self in 1888. In politics, he was first elected to the Chamber of Deputies in 1889 as a Boulangist and would play a prominent political role for the rest of his life.

Barrès was associated in his literary works with Symbolism, a movement which had equivalence with British Aestheticism and Italian Decadentism; indeed he was a close associate of Gabriele d'Annunzio representing the latter. As the name of his trilogy suggests, his works glorified a humanistic love of the self and he also flirted with occult mysticisms in his youth. The Dreyfus affair saw an ideological shift from a liberal individualism rooted in the French Revolution to a more organic and traditional concept of the nation. He also became a leading anti-Dreyfusard popularising the term nationalisme to describe his views. He stood on a platform of "Nationalism and Protectionism.".

Politically, he became involved with various groups such as the Ligue des Patriotes of Paul Déroulède, which he became the leader of in 1914. Barrès was close to Charles Maurras, the founder of Action Française, a monarchist party. Despite the fact that he remained a republican, Barrès would have a strong influence on various following French monarchists, as well as various other figures. During the First World War, he was a strong supporter of the Union Sacrée political truce. In later life, Barrès returned to the Catholic faith and was involved in a campaign to restore French church buildings and helped establish 24 June as a national day of remembrance for St. Joan of Arc.

Biography

Early years

Born at Charmes, Vosges, he received his secondary education at the lycée of Nancy, attending there the lessons of Auguste Burdeau, later pictured as social climber Paul Bouteiller in Les Déracinés. In 1883 continued his legal studies in Paris. Establishing himself at first in the Quartier Latin, he became acquainted with Leconte de Lisle's cenacle and with the symbolists in the 1880s, even meeting Victor Hugo once. He had already started contributing to the monthly periodical, Jeune France (Young France), and he now issued a periodical of his own, Les Taches d'encre, which survived for only a few months. After four years of journalism he settled in Italy, where he wrote Sous l'œil des barbares (1888), the first volume of a trilogie du moi (also called Le Culte du moi or The Cult of the Self), completed by Un Homme libre (1889), and Le Jardin de Bérénice (1891). The Cult of the Self trilogy was influenced by Romanticism, and also made an apology of the pleasure of the senses.

He supplemented these apologies for his narcissism with L'Ennemi des lois (1892), and with an admirable volume of impressions of travel, Du sang, de la volupté, de la mort (1893). Barrès wrote his early books in an elaborate and often very obscure style.

The Comédie Française produced his play Une Journée parlementaire in 1894. A year after establishing himself in Neuilly, he began his trilogy in 1897, Le Roman de l'énergie nationale (Novel of the National Energy), with the publication of Les Déracinés. In this second major trilogy, he superated his early individualism with a patriotic fidelity to the fatherland and an organicist conception of the nation (see below for details). Affected by the Dreyfus Affair, and finding himself on the side of the Anti-Dreyfusards, Barrès played a leading role alongside Charles Maurras, which initiated his shift to the political right; Barrès oriented himself towards a lyrical form of nationalism, founded on the cult of the earth and the dead ("la terre et les morts", "earth and the dead" — see below for details).

The Roman de l'énergie nationale trilogy makes a plea for local patriotism, militarism, the faith to one's roots and to one's family, and for the preservation of the distinctive qualities of the old French provinces. Les Déracinés narrates the adventures of seven young Lorrainers who set out to conquer fortune in Paris. Six of them survive in the second novel of the trilogy, L'Appel au soldat (1900), which gives the history of Boulangism; the sequel, Leurs figures (1902), deals with the Panama scandals. Later works include:
Scènes et doctrines du nationalisme (1902)
Les Amitiés françaises (1903), in which he urges the inculcation of patriotism by the early study of national history
Ce que j'ai vu à Rennes (1904)
Au service de l'Allemagne (1905), the experiences of an Alsatian conscript in a German regiment
Le Voyage de Sparte (1906).

He presented himself in 1905 to the Académie française, but was supplanted by Etienne Lamy. He then tried again, but inclined himself before the candidacy of the former Minister Alexandre Ribot. But he was finally elected the next year, gaining 25 voices against 8 to Edmond Hauraucourt and one to Jean Aicart on 25 January 1906.

Barrès was also a friend since his youth of the occultist Stanislas de Guaita, and was attracted by Asia, sufism and shi'ism. But he returned in his later years to the Catholic faith, engaging in L'Echo de Paris a campaign in favour of the restoration of the churches of France. His son Philippe Barrès followed him in a journalism career.

Political activism
As a young man, Barrès carried his Romantic and individualist theory of the Ego into politics as an ardent partisan of General Boulanger, locating himself in the more populist side of the heterogenous Boulangist coalition. He directed a Boulangist paper at Nancy, and was elected deputy in 1889, at the age of 27, under a platform of "Nationalism, Protectionism, and Socialism", retaining his seat in the legislature until 1893, when he was defeated under the etiquette of "National Republican and Socialist" (Républicain nationaliste et socialiste). From 1889, Barrès' activism overshadowed his literary activities, although he tried to maintain both.

He shifted however to the right-wing during the Dreyfus Affair, becoming a leading mouthpiece, alongside Charles Maurras, of the Anti-Dreyfusard side. The Socialist leader Léon Blum tried to convince him to join the Dreyfusards, but Barrès refused and wrote several anti-Semitic pamphlets. He wrote, "That Dreyfus is guilty, I deduce not from the facts themselves, but from his race." Barrès' anti-Jewishness found its roots both in the scientific racial contemporary theories and on Biblical exegesis.

He founded the short-lived review La Cocarde (The Cockade) in 1894 (September 1894 – March 1895) to defend his ideas, attempting to bridge the gap between the far-left and the far-right. The Cocarde, nationalist, anti-parliamentarist and anti-foreign, included a diverse collection of contributors from a wide variety of backgrounds (monarchists, socialists, anarchists, Jews, Protestants), including Frédéric Amouretti, Charles Maurras, René Boylesve and Fernand Pelloutier.

He was again beaten during the 1896 elections in Neuilly, as a candidate of the Socialist leader Jean Jaurès, and then again in 1897 as a nationalist anti-Semitic candidate, having broken with the left-wing during the Dreyfus Affair.

Barrès then assumed the leadership of the Ligue de la Patrie française (League of the French Fatherland), before taking membership in the Ligue des Patriotes (Patriot League) of Paul Déroulède. In 1914, he became the leader of the Patriot League.

Close to the nationalist writer Charles Maurras, founder of the monarchist Action française movement, Barrès refused however to endorse monarchist ideas, although he demonstrated sympathy throughout his life for the Action française. Most of the later monarchist theorists (Jacques Bainville, Henri Vaugeois, Léon Daudet, Henri Massis, Jacques Maritain, Georges Bernanos, Thierry Maulnier...) have recognised their debt toward Barrès, who also inspired several generations of writers (among which Montherlant, Malraux, Mauriac and Aragon).

Barrès was elected deputy of the Seine in 1906, and retained his seat until his death. He sat at that time among the Entente républicaine démocratique conservative party. In 1908, he opposed in Parliament his friend and political opponent Jean Jaurès, refusing the Socialist leader's will to Pantheonize the writer Émile Zola. Despite his political views, he was one of the first to show his respect to Jaurès' remains after his assassination on the eve of World War I.

During World War I, Barrès was one of the proponents of the Union Sacrée, which earned him the nickname "nightingale of bloodshed" ("rossignol des carnages"). The Canard enchaîné satirical newspaper called him the "chief of the tribe of brainwashers" ("chef de la tribu des bourreurs de crâne"). His personal notes showed however that he himself did not always believe in his purported war optimism, being at times close to defeatism. During the war Barrès also partly came back on the mistakes of his youth, by paying tribute to French Jews in Les familles spirituelles de la France, where he placed them as one of the four elements of the "national genius", alongside Traditionalists, Protestants and Socialists – thus opposing himself to Maurras who saw in them the "four confederate states" of "Anti-France".

After World War I, Barrès demanded the annexation of Luxembourg into the French Republic, and also sought to increase French influence in the Rhineland. On 24 June 1920, the National Assembly adopted his draft aiming to establish a national day in remembrance of Joan of Arc.

Nationalism

Barrès is considered, alongside Charles Maurras, as one of the main thinkers of ethnic nationalism at the turn of the century in France, associated with Revanchism — the desire to reconquer the Alsace-Lorraine, annexed by the newly created German Empire at the end of the 1871 Franco-Prussian War (Barrès was aged 8 at that time). In fact, he himself popularised the word "nationalism" in French.

This has been noted by Zeev Sternhell, Michel Winock (who titled the first part of his book, Le Siècle des intellectuels, "Les Années Barrès" ("The Barrès' Years"), followed by Les Années André Gide and Les Années Jean-Paul Sartre), Pierre-André Taguieff, etc. He shared as common points with Paul Bourget his disdain for utilitarianism and liberalism.

Opposed to Jean-Jacques Rousseau's theory of social contract, Barrès considered the 'Nation' (which he used to replace the 'People') as already historically founded: it did not need a "general will" to establish itself, thus also contrasting with Ernest Renan's definition of the Nation. Much closer to Herder and Fichte than to Renan in his definition of the Nation, Barrès opposed French centralism (as did Maurras), as he considered the Nation to be a multiplicity of local allegiances, first to the family, the village, the region, and ultimately to the nation-state. Influenced by Edmund Burke, Frédéric Le Play and Hippolyte Taine, he developed an organicist conception of the Nation which contrasted with the universalism of the 1789 Declaration of the Rights of Man and of the Citizen. According to Barrès, the People is not founded by an act of autonomy, but find its origins in the earth (le sol), history (institutions, life and material conditions) and traditions and inheritance ("the dead"). His early individualism was quickly superated by an organicist theory of the social link, in which "the individual is nothing, society is everything").

Barrès feared miscegenation of modern times, represented by Paris, claiming against Michelet that it jeopardised the unity of the Nation. The Nation was to be balanced between various local nationalities (he spoke of the "Lorraine nationality" as much as of the "French nationality") through decentralisation and the call for a leader, giving a Bonapartist aspect to his thought which explained his attraction for the General Boulanger and his opposition to liberal democracy. He pleaded for a direct democracy and personalisation of power, as well as for the implementation of popular referendums as done in Switzerland. In this nationalist frame, anti-Semitism was to be the cohesive factor for a right-wing mass movement.

Contrary to popular belief, Maurice Barrès never used the term “le grand remplacement” [great replacement], either in his novel "L'appel au soldat" or anywhere else. However he did make use of the underlying concept, namely that the French national character was being harmed by immigration of certain ethnic groups.

Hispanophilia 
Barrès was a noted hispanophile. Influenced by the romantic mythification of Spain, he described the country as "an Africa leaving your soul with a sort of furor so fast as chilli does in your mouth". Always passionate about the "South" and "Orient", he emphasized in his work the period of Moorish domination. He interpreted the Spain of the time as a nation refractory  to the attempts of economic and bureaucratic rationalization threatening his own country. He visited Spain in 1892, 1893 and 1902, capturing his vision of the country in his writings, taking a particular interest in Toledo.

Dada and Barrès
The Dadaists organised in spring 1921 the trial of Barrès, charged with an "attack on the safety of the mind" ("attentat à la sûreté de l'esprit") and sentenced him to 20 years of forced labour. This fictitious trial also marked the dissolution of Dada - its founders, among whom was Tristan Tzara, refusing any form of justice even if organised by Dada.

Final years and death

An Orientalist romance, Un jardin sur l'Oronte (A Garden on the Orontes)—which would be the basis of an opera of the same name—was published in 1922, triggering what would be called  (the Orontes Quarrel).

Barrès died in Neuilly-sur-Seine on 4 December 1923.

Works in English translation
 The Undying Spirit of France, Yale University Press, 1917.
 "Young Soldiers of France". In The War and the Spirit of Youth, Atlantic Monthly Company, 1917.
 Colette Baudoche: The Story of a Young Girl of Metz, George H. Doran Company, 1918.
 "Officers and Gentlemen", The Atlantic Monthly, Vol. CXXI, 1918.
 The Faith of France, Houghton Mifflin & Company, 1918.
 The Sacred Hill, The Macaulay Company, 1929.
 "Uprooted". In The World's Greatest Books, W. H. Wise & Co., 1941.

Other
 Massia Bibikoff, Our Indians at Marseilles, with an Introduction by Maurice Barrès, Smith, Elder and Company, 1915.
 Georges Lafond, Covered with Mud and Glory, with a Preface by Maurice Barrès, Small, Maynard & Company, 1918.

References

Further reading 

 Bourne, Randolph S. (1914). "Maurice Barres and the Youth of France", The Atlantic Monthly, Vol. CXIV, No. 3, pp. 394–399.
 Bregy, Katherine (1927). "Mysteries and Maurice Barrès," Commonweal, p. 468.
 Cabeen, D. C. (1929). "Maurice Barrès and the 'Young' Reviews," Modern Language Notes, Vol. 44, No. 8, pp. 532–537.
 Cheydleur, F. D. (1926). "Maurice Barres: Author and Patriot", The North American Review, Vol. CCXXIII, No. 830, pp. 150–156.
 Clyne, Anthony (1920). "Maurice Barrès," The Contemporary Review, Vol. CXVII, pp. 682–688.
 Curtis, Michael (1959). Three Against the Third Republic: Sorel, Barrès and Maurras. Transaction Publishers.
 Eccles, F. Y. (1908). "Maurice Barrès", The Dublin Review, Vol. CXLIII, No. 286, pp. 244–263.
 Doty, C. Stewart (1976). From Cultural Rebellion to Counterrevolution: The Politics of Maurice Barrès. Ohio University Press.
 Evans, Silvan (1962). Eastern Bastion: The Life and Works of Maurice Barrès: A Short Centenary Study. Ilfracombe: A.H. Stockwell.
 Fleming, Thomas (2011). "Colette Baudoche by Maurice Barrès", Chronicles Magazine.
 Gide, André (1959). "The Barrès Problem." In: Pretexts: Reflections on Literature and Morality. New York: Meridan Books, pp. 74–90.
 Gosse, Edmund (1914). "M. Maurice Barrès". In: French Profiles. New York: Charles Scribner's Sons, pp. 287–295.
 Greaves, Anthony A. (1978). Maurice Barrès. Boston: Twayne Publishers.
 Grover, M. (1969). "The Inheritors of Maurice Barrès", The Modern Language Review, Vol. 64, No. 3, pp. 529–545.
 Guérard, Albert Léon (1916). "Maurice Barrés". In: Five Masters of French Romance. London: T. Fisher Unwin, pp. 216–248.
  
 Huneker, James (1909). "The Evolution of an Egoist: Maurice Barrès". In: Egoists: A Book of Supermen. New York: Charles Scribner's Sons, pp. 207–235.
 Hutchinson, Hilary (1994). "Gide and Barrès: Fifty Years of Protest", The Modern Language Review, Vol. 89, No. 4, pp. 856–864.
 Maloney, Wendi A. (1988). Maurice Barrès and the Cult of Adolescence. University of Wisconsin-Madison.
 Ouston, Philip (1974). The Imagination of Maurice Barrès. University of Toronto Press.
 Perry, Catherine (1998). "Reconfiguring Wagner's Tristan: Political Aesthetics in the Works of Maurice Barrès"", French Forum, Vol. 23, No. 3, pp. 317–335.
 Robinson, Agnes Mary Frances (1919). "Maurice Barrès." In: Twentieth Century French Writers. London: W. Collins Sons & Co., pp. 1–33.
 Scheifley, William H. (1924). "Maurice Barrès," The Sewanee Review, Vol. 32, No. 4, pp. 464–473.
 Sergeant, Elizabeth Shepley (1914). "Maurice Barrès", The New Republic, Vol. I, No. 6, p. 26.
 Stephens, Winifred (1908). "Maurice Barrès, 1862". In: French Novelists of Today. London: John Lane, The Bodley Head, pp. 179–220.
 Souday, Paul (1924). "Maurice Barrès", The Living Age, Vol. CCCXX, No. 4153, pp. 269–271.
 Soucy, Robert (1963). The Image of the Hero in the Works of Maurice Barrès and Pierre Drieu la Rochelle. University of Wisconsin-Madison.
 Soucy, Robert (1967). "Barrès and Fascism", French Historical Studies, Vol. 5, No. 1, pp. 67–97. 
 Stephens, Winifred (1919). The France I Know. New York: E.P. Dutton & Company.
 Thorold, Algar (1916). "The Ideas of Maurice Barrès", The Edinburgh Review, Vol. CCXXIII, No. 455, pp. 83–99.
 Trevor Field (1982). Maurice Barrès. London: Grant & Cutler, Ltd.
 Turquet-Milnes, G. (1921). "Maurice Barrès." In: Some Modern French Writers. New York: Robert M. McBride & Company, pp. 79–106.
 Shenton, Gordon (1979). The Fictions of the Self: The Early Works of Maurice Barrès. U.N.C. Department of Romance Languages.
 Soucy, Robert (1972). Fascism in France: The Case of Maurice Barrès. University of California Press.
 Sternhell, Zeev (1971). "Barres et la Gauche: Du Boulangisme a "la Cocarde" (1889–1895)", Le Mouvement Social, Vol. 95, pp. 77–130.
 Sternhell, Zeev (1973). "National Socialism and Antisemitism: The Case of Maurice Barrès", Journal of Contemporary History, Vol. 8, No. 4, pp. 47–66.
 Suleiman, Susan Rubin (1980). "The Structure of Confrontation: Nizan, Barrès, Malraux," MLN, Vol. 95, No. 4, 938–967.
 Virtanen, Reino (1947). "Barrès and Pascal," PMLA, Vol. 62, No. 3, pp. 802–823.
 Weber, Eugen (1975). "Inheritance and Dilettantism: the Politics of Maurice Barrès", Historical Reflections/Réflexions Historiques, Vol. 2, No. 1, pp. 109–131.

In foreign languages
 René Jacquet (1900). Notre Maître Maurice Barrès, Librairie Nilsson.
 J. Ernest Charles (1907). La Carrière de Maurice Barrès, Académicien, E. Sansot & Cie.
 René Gillouin (1907). Maurice Barrès, E. Sansot & Cie.
 Henri Massis (1909). La Pensée de Maurice Barrès, Mercure de France.
 Nicolas Beauduin (1910). "L'Evolution de Maurice Barrès", Quelques Uns, No. 1.
 Jean Herluison (1911). Maurice Barrès et le Problème de l'Ordre, Nouvelle Librairie Nationale.
 Jacques Jary (1912). Essai sur l'Art et la Psychologie de Maurice Barrès, Emile-Paul.
 Paul Bourget (1924). La Leçon de Barrès, À la Cité des Livres.
 François Mauriac (1945). La Rencontre avec Barrès, La Table Ronde.
 Albert Garreau (1945). Barrès, Défenseur de la Civilisation, Éditions des Loisirs.
 Sarah Vajda (2000). Maurice Barrès, Flammarion.

External links 

 
  
 Barrès' Speeches at the Académie française 
 Letters between Barrès and Anna de Noailles (audio) 
 Dreyfus Rehabilitated
 Barrès, Maurice (1862–1923), at Gallica
 

 
1862 births
1923 deaths
People from Vosges (department)
French Roman Catholics
Politicians from Grand Est
Boulangists
Republican Federation politicians
Members of the 5th Chamber of Deputies of the French Third Republic
Members of the 9th Chamber of Deputies of the French Third Republic
Members of the 10th Chamber of Deputies of the French Third Republic
Members of the 11th Chamber of Deputies of the French Third Republic
Members of the 12th Chamber of Deputies of the French Third Republic
Writers from Grand Est
French political philosophers
French nationalists
19th-century French novelists
20th-century French novelists
20th-century male writers
Members of the Ligue des Patriotes
Members of the Ligue de la patrie française
Members of the Académie Française
French people of World War I
Antisemitism in France
Antidreyfusards
Barrès family